Paul G. Blazer High School is a public high school in Ashland, Kentucky, United States. It was named for Paul G. Blazer and is part of the Ashland Independent School District. It replaced the former Ashland High School on Lexington Avenue and the former Booker T. Washington Grade and High School at Seventh Street and Central Avenue in 1962. It is designed in a campus-style layout with seven buildings which is unique among high schools in the region, as most consist of a single building.

Notable alumni 
 Arliss Beach, National Football League player
 Larry Conley, professional basketball player
 Drew Hall, former Major League Baseball pitcher
 Ashley Judd, actress and political activist
 Wynonna Judd, country singer
 Charlie Reliford, Major League Baseball umpire
 Harold Sergent, former basketball player
 Robert Smedley, professional wrestler, author
 Brandon Webb, former Major League Baseball player, 2006 National League and 2006 Cy Young Award
 Chuck Woolery, game show host, talk show host, and musician

References

External links 
 

Ashland, Kentucky
Schools in Boyd County, Kentucky
Public high schools in Kentucky
Educational institutions established in 1962
1962 establishments in Kentucky